The 1949–50 NBA season was the second season for the Rochester Royals in the National Basketball Association (NBA).

Draft picks

Roster

|-
! colspan="2" style="background-color: #FFFFFF;  color: #0046AD; text-align: center;" | Rochester Royals 1949–50 roster
|- style="background-color: #D0103A; color: #FFFFFF;   text-align: center;"
! Players !! Coaches
|-
| valign="top" |
{| class="sortable" style="background:transparent; margin:0px; width:100%"
! Pos. !! # !! Nat. !! Name !! Ht. !! Wt. !! From
|-

Regular season

Season standings

Record vs. opponents

Game log

Playoffs

|- align="center" bgcolor="#ffcccc"
| 1
| March 21
| Minneapolis
| L 76–78
| Bob Davies (26)
| Bob Davies (6)
| Edgerton Park Arena
| 0–1
|-

|- align="center" bgcolor="#ffcccc"
| 1
| March 23
| Fort Wayne
| L 84–90
| three players tied (15)
| Edgerton Park Arena
| 0–1
|- align="center" bgcolor="#ffcccc"
| 2
| March 24
| @ Fort Wayne
| L 78–79 (OT)
| Arnie Risen (17)
| North Side High School Gym
| 0–2
|-

Awards and records
 Bob Davies, All-NBA First Team

References

Sacramento Kings seasons
Rochester
Rochester Royals
Rochester Royals